Oxfam Novib/PEN Award for Freedom of Expression is a literary award made in collaboration with PEN International Writers in Prison Committee, the PEN Emergency Fund, and Oxfam Novib (the Dutch affiliate of the international Oxfam organization).  The award is to recognize writers who have been persecuted for their work and continue working despite the consequences. Honorees receive .

The award is one of many PEN awards sponsored by International PEN affiliates in over 145 PEN centres around the world.

Honorees
2005
Sihem Bensedrine (Tunisia), journalist and human rights activist
Neziha Rejiba (Tunisia), journalist and editor
Sarah Mkhonza (Swaziland), novelist and columnist 
Claudia Anthony (Sierra Leone), journalist 
Duong Thu Huong (Vietnam), novelist
2006
Simon Mol (Poland), journalist
Andrej Dyńko (Belarus)
Roya Toloui (Iran/Kurdistan)
Faraj Bayrakdar (Syria)
Hrant Dink (Turkey)
2007
Fatou Jaw-Manneh (Gambia), journalist
Svetlana Alexievich (Belarus), writer
Lydia Cacho Ribeiro (Mexico), writer
Ekbal Baraka (Egypt)
2008
Dejan Anastasijevic (Serbia), journalist
Pierre Roger Lambo Sanjo (Cameroon), writer
Christopher Mlalazi and Raisedon Baya (Zimbabwe), playwrights 
Maung Thura and Saw Wei (Burma), poets
2009
Chi Dang (Vietnam), writer
Maziar Bahari (Iranian-Canadian), journalist
Irakli Kakabadze (Georgia), writer
Sonali Samarasinghe Wickrematunge (Sri Lanka), journalist
Daniel Coronell (Colombia), columnist
2010 [no award]
2011
Andrei Nekrasov (Russia), film and journalist
Sakit Zahidov (Azerbaijan), journalist and poet
Nedim Şener (Turkey), journalist
J.S. Tissainayagam (Sri Lanka), journalist
2012
Asieh Amini (Iran), journalist, blogger and activist
Jesús Lemus Barajas (Mexico), journalist and writer 
Mikhail Bekhetof (Russia), journalist
Rachid Nini (Morocco), newspaper editor
Alhaj Warrag and Abdul Moniem Suleman (Sudan), newspaper founder/editor; and columnist (respectively)
2013
Samar Yazbek (Syria), writer and journalist
Enoh Meyomesse (Cameroon) Writer, activist
Nargess Mohammadi (Iran), journalist activist
Deo Namujimbo (Congo), journalist
Busra Ersanli (Turkey), writer, academic
2014
Abdiaziz Abdinur Ibrahim (Somalia), freelance journalist
Oksana Chelysheva (Russia), journalist, activist
Dina Meza (Honduras), journalist, activist
2015
Bahman Ahmadi-Amouee and Jila Bani Yaghoub (Iran), journalists
Razan Naiem Almoghrabi (Libya), writer, journalist, and advocate of women’s rights 
Abdelmoneim Rahama (Sudan), poet, writer and journalist
2016
Amanuel Asrat (Eritrea), poet, writer and editor-in-chief
Can Dündar (Turkey), writer and journalist
Omar Hazek (Egypt), poet and writer
2017
Ashraf Fayadh (Palestine), poet
Malini Subramaniam (India), journalist
2018
Eskinder Nega (Ethiopian), journalist
Milagros Socorro (Venezuelan), journalist
2019
Dareen Tatour (Palestinian), poet
Gioconda Belli (Nicaraguan), author
Roberto Saviano (Italian), journalist
2020
Stella Nyanzi (Ugandan), academic, writer and feminist activist.
2021
Tsitsi Dangarembga (Zimbabwean), author

References

Awards established in 2005
International PEN literary awards
British literary awards
Literary awards honouring human rights